St. Peter's First Community Church, also known as the German Reformed Church and St. Peter's United Church of Christ, is a historic church located at Huntington, Huntington County, Indiana.  It was built in 1903, and is a red brick and limestone church building with an eclectic plan and Late Victorian design elements.  It features a two-tiered central tower with angled buttresses, tall and narrow openings, and topped by a steep pyramidal bell-cast roof. Its stained glass windows include German language texts and an image of Christ's ascension. The building was designed by Will A. Stevens, a Huntington native who graduated from Cornell University in 1890.

It was listed on the National Register of Historic Places in 1985. It is located in the Drover Town Historic District.

References

External links
St. Peter's First Community Church website

Churches on the National Register of Historic Places in Indiana
Victorian architecture in Indiana
Churches completed in 1903
Churches in Huntington County, Indiana
National Register of Historic Places in Huntington County, Indiana
Historic district contributing properties in Indiana